Fibre Channel Utility is a Mac OS X Server utility for managing Fibre Channels connected to the server. The program will not run without a Fiber Card installed in the server.

References

MacOS Server